Valentina Bellè (born 16 April 1992) is an Italian actress.

Biography
Born in Verona from an Italian father and a German mother, as a child she showed interest in art and studied acting. After finishing high school, Valentina worked as a model, taking part in fashion shows and photo shoots.

In 2012, at the age of 19, she spent four months in New York City and attended the Lee Strasberg Theatre and Film Institute to undertake acting classes. In 2013, Bellè tried to enter the Centro Sperimentale di Cinematografia in Rome, where she was refused. From there, she left for London to learn English and at the Royal Academy of Dramatic Art, but received a call from the CSC from Rome: one of the girls accepted at the Centro Sperimentale had refused the seat, so Valentina took her place.

Upon graduation from the CSC, she received her first and most important television role as Lucrezia Tornabuoni in the TV series Medici: Masters of Florence. She became well-known on the silver screen for her performances in movies like Wondrous Boccaccio and Rainbow: A Private Affair, both directed by the Taviani brothers.

In 2018, she took part on the TV series Genius, where she played the role of Jacqueline Roque, last wife of Pablo Picasso, portrayed by Antonio Banderas.

Filmography

Films

Television

References

External links
 

1992 births
Living people
Actors from Verona
People from Verona
Italian film actresses
Italian stage actresses
Italian television actresses
21st-century Italian actresses
Italian people of German descent